David Hernán Drocco (born 20 January 1989) is an Argentine professional footballer who plays as a midfielder for Primera Nacional side Quilmes Atlético Club.

External links
 David Drocco at Football-Lineups
 
 

1989 births
Living people
Argentine footballers
Argentine expatriate footballers
Boca Juniors footballers
Atlético Tucumán footballers
San Martín de San Juan footballers
Sportivo Desamparados footballers
Audax Italiano footballers
Arsenal de Sarandí footballers
Club Atlético Huracán footballers
Quilmes Atlético Club footballers
Chilean Primera División players
Argentine Primera División players
Expatriate footballers in Chile
Association football forwards
Footballers from Córdoba, Argentina